Beni may refer to:

Characters 
Beni Gabor, a character in the 1999 film The Mummy
Benimaru Nikaido, fan nickname of a character in The King of Fighters

People

Given name
Beni (Australian musician), Australian musician and disc jockey
Beni (singer) (born 1986), Japanese singer, formerly known by the name Beni Arashiro
Beni Badibanga (born 1996), Belgian footballer
Beni Bertrand Binobagira, Burundian swimmer
Beni Madhab Das (1866–1952), Indian Bengali scholar
Beni Gassenbauer (born 1949), Israeli artist
Beni Hofer (born 1978), Swiss freestyle skier
Beni Kiendé (born 1986), Gabonese footballer
Beni Lar, Nigerian politician
Beni Montresor (1926–2001), Italian artist, opera and film director, set designer, author and illustrator
Beni Obermüller (1930–2005), German alpine skier
Beni Takemata, Japanese shogi player
Beni Mukendi (born 2002), Angolan footballer

Surname
Alfred Beni (1923-1995), Austrian chess master
Alphonse Beni (born 1946), Cameroonian actor and film director
Bhagat Beni (  15th–16th century), saint of Sikhism
Claudia Beni (born 1986), Croatian singer
Elisa Beni (born 1965), Spanish journalist
Federico de Beni  (born 1973), Italian cyclist
Gerardo Beni, American physicist and electrical engineer
Jules Beni (died 1861), American outlaw

Places

Bolivia
Beni Department
Beni River
Beni savanna

Egypt
Beni Suef
Beni Hasan an Ancient Egyptian cemetery site

Morocco
Beni Mellal
Beni ʿAmir

Elsewhere
Beni, Democratic Republic of the Congo, a city in North Kivu province
Beni (commune), a commune in the city
Beni, Nepal (disambiguation)

Other uses 
Beni (album), the debut album of J-pop singer Beni
Beni (music), a Tanzanian/Tanganyikan musical style
Beni (Thracian tribe), a historical tribe in Eastern and Southeastern Europe
Beni Ḥassān, a historical Bedouin tribe
Beni (紅), Japanese for the color carthamin or safflower red
Beni or Béni, a transliteration of Banu, an Arabic tribal progenitor meaning "the sons of" or "children of"

See also
 Bani (disambiguation)
 Bene (disambiguation)
 Benni, a given name and surname